Letson is a surname. Notable people with the surname include:

Al Letson (born 1972), American poet, journalist, and radio and podcast host
Harry Letson (1896–1992), Canadian engineer and educator
Jody Letson (born 1949), American politician
Tom Letson (born 1952), American politician